Annalise Pickrel (born May 2, 1992) is an American professional basketball player. She currently plays for the Dandenong Rangers in the WNBL.

Career

Australia
After leaving college, Pickrel failed to get drafted and soon after headed to Australia to play in the Women's National Basketball League with the Dandenong Rangers. She found herself on a roster alongside Penny Taylor and Cappie Pondexter. During the off-season, Pickrel narrowly failed to get a place on the roster of the Los Angeles Sparks. She then returned to Dandenong for the 2015–16 season.

Michigan  State statistics
Source

References

1992 births
Living people
Forwards (basketball)
American women's basketball players
Basketball players from Grand Rapids, Michigan
Michigan State Spartans women's basketball players
Dandenong Rangers players